The year 1973 in film involved some significant events.

Highest-grossing films

United States and Canada

The top ten 1973 released films by box office gross in the United States and Canada are as follows:

Outside North America
The highest-grossing 1973 films in countries outside of North America.

Worldwide gross revenue
The following table lists known worldwide gross revenue figures for several high-grossing films that originally released in 1973. Note that this list is incomplete and is therefore not representative of the highest-grossing films worldwide in 1973. The worldwide revenue for The Sting, for example, is not known. This list also includes gross revenue from later re-releases.

The year's highest-grossing actor worldwide was Hong Kong martial arts film star Bruce Lee, who died the same year.

Events
March – Five Fingers of Death is released in the United States and is a surprise success starting a kung fu film craze in North America
April 11 – Kim Jong-il publishes his film treatise On the Art of the Cinema.
May 1 – The Marx Brothers' Zeppo Marx divorces his second wife, Barbara Blakely; she will marry actor/singer Frank Sinatra in 1976.
July 20 – Martial arts legend Bruce Lee dies before Enter the Dragon is released on July 26.
August 17 – The sci-fi movie Westworld is the first feature film to use digital image processing.
December 25 – The Sting is released and goes on to become one of the top-grossing films of all time.
December 26 – The Exorcist reawakens the horror film genre and becomes one of the most popular and controversial films ever released.

Awards 

Palme d'Or (Cannes Film Festival):
The Hireling, directed by Alan Bridges, United Kingdom
Scarecrow, directed by Jerry Schatzberg, United States

Golden Bear (Berlin Film Festival):
Ashani Sanket (Distant Thunder), directed by Satyajit Ray, India

Notable films released in 1973
United States unless stated

#
The 14, directed by David Hemmings, starring Jack Wild – (U.K.)

A
Abhimaan (Pride) – (India)
Ace Eli and Rodger of the Skies, starring Cliff Robertson and Pamela Franklin
The Adventures of Rabbi Jacob (Les Aventures de Rabbi Jacob) – (France)
All Nudity Shall Be Punished (Toda Nudez Será Castigada) – (Brazil)
The Alpha Caper, starring Henry Fonda and Leonard Nimoy
Alvin Purple – (Australia)
Amarcord, directed by Federico Fellini – (Italy)
American Graffiti, directed by George Lucas, starring Richard Dreyfuss, Ron Howard, Cindy Williams, Paul Le Mat, Candy Clark and Harrison Ford
Ana and the Wolves (Ana y los lobos), starring Geraldine Chaplin – (Spain)
And Now the Screaming Starts!, starring Peter Cushing, Stephanie Beacham and Herbert Lom
Arnold, starring Stella Stevens, Roddy McDowall and Elsa Lanchester
Ashani Sanket (Distant Thunder), directed by Satyajit Ray – Golden Bear winner – (India)

B
The Baby, starring Anjanette Comer and Ruth Roman
Badlands, directed by Terrence Malick, starring Martin Sheen, Sissy Spacek and Warren Oates
Bang the Drum Slowly, starring Robert De Niro and Michael Moriarty
Bat Pussy, believed to have been made or released in 1973
Battle for the Planet of the Apes, starring Roddy McDowall, Claude Akins, Natalie Trundy and John Huston
Battles Without Honor and Humanity (ingi naki tatakai) – (Japan)
Baxter!, starring Patricia Neal and Britt Ekland – (U.K.)
Black Caesar, starring Fred Williamson
Black Holiday (La Villeggiatura), starring Adolfo Celi – (Italy)
Blood Brothers (Ci Ma), directed by Chang Cheh – (Hong Kong)
Blood in the Streets, a.k.a. Revolver, starring Oliver Reed – (Italy/France/West Germany)
Blood of the Dragon (Zhui ming qiang) – (Hong Kong)
Blue Blood, starring Oliver Reed, Fiona Lewis and Derek Jacobi- (U.K.)
Blume in Love, starring George Segal, Susan Anspach and Kris Kristofferson
Bobby, starring Rishi Kapoor – (India)
Book of Numbers, directed, produced by and starring Raymond St. Jacques
Il Boss, starring Henry Silva and Richard Conte – (Italy)
Breezy, directed by Clint Eastwood, starring William Holden and Kay Lenz
A Brief Vacation (Una breve vacanza), directed by Vittorio De Sica – (Italy)
Brother of the Wind

C
Cahill U.S. Marshal, starring John Wayne and George Kennedy
Can Dialectics Break Bricks? (La Dialectique Peut-Elle Casser Des Briques?) – (France)
The Candy Snatchers, starring Tiffany Bolling
Charley and the Angel, starring Fred MacMurray, Cloris Leachman and Kurt Russell
Charley Varrick, directed by Don Siegel, starring Walter Matthau, John Vernon, Joe Don Baker, Andy Robinson, Sheree North and Felicia Farr
Charlotte's Web, an animated film directed by Charles A. Nichols and Iwao Takamoto, with the voices of Debbie Reynolds and Henry Gibson
Chino, directed by John Sturges, starring Charles Bronson
Cinderella Liberty, directed by Mark Rydell, starring James Caan and Marsha Mason
Class of '44, starring Gary Grimes
Cleopatra Jones, starring Tamara Dobson and Shelley Winters
Coffy, starring Pam Grier
Cops and Robbers, starring Joseph Bologna and Cliff Gorman
The Crazies, directed by George A. Romero
The Creeping Flesh, starring Christopher Lee and Peter Cushing – (U.K.)

D
Dark Places, starring Christopher Lee, Joan Collins and Jane Birkin – (U.K.)
Day for Night, directed by François Truffaut, starring Jacqueline Bisset, Valentina Cortese, Jean-Pierre Léaud and Jean-Pierre Aumont – Academy Award and Bafta winner – (France)
The Day of the Dolphin, directed by Mike Nichols, starring George C. Scott, Trish Van Devere and Paul Sorvino
The Day of the Jackal, directed by Fred Zinnemann, starring Edward Fox, Michael Lonsdale and Delphine Seyrig – (U.K./France)
The Death of a Lumberjack (La Mort d'un bûcheron) – (Canada)
A Delicate Balance, starring Katharine Hepburn, Paul Scofield, Lee Remick, Kate Reid and Betsy Blair
The Devil in Miss Jones, adult film, directed by Gerard Damiano
Dillinger, directed by John Milius, starring Warren Oates, Harry Dean Stanton, Richard Dreyfuss and Geoffrey Lewis
A Doll's House, starring Claire Bloom and Anthony Hopkins – (U.K.)
The Don Is Dead, starring Anthony Quinn, Robert Forster, Al Lettieri and Ina Balin
Don't Be Afraid of the Dark, starring Kim Darby and Jim Hutton
Don't Look Now, directed by Nicolas Roeg, starring Julie Christie and Donald Sutherland – (U.K./Italy)

E
The Earth Is a Sinful Song (Maa on syntinen laulu) – (Finland)
Electra Glide in Blue, starring Robert Blake
Emperor of the North Pole, directed by Robert Aldrich, starring Lee Marvin, Ernest Borgnine, Keith Carradine and Charles Tyner
England Made Me, starring Peter Finch and Michael York – (U.K.)
Enter the Dragon, starring Bruce Lee, John Saxon, Jim Kelly – (Hong Kong/United States)
Executive Action, starring Burt Lancaster and Robert Ryan
The Exorcist, directed by William Friedkin, starring Ellen Burstyn, Linda Blair, Jason Miller and Max von Sydow—winner of 5 Golden Globes and 2 Oscars

F
Fantastic Planet (La Planète Sauvage) – (France/Czechoslovakia)
Fé, Esperanza y Caridad (Faith, Hope and Charity), starring Katy Jurado – (Mexico)
The Final Programme, starring Jon Finch, Jenny Runacre and Graham Crowden – (U.K.)
Five on the Black Hand Side, starring Godfrey Cambridge
Forced Entry, adult film starring Harry Reems
The Friends of Eddie Coyle, directed by Peter Yates, starring Robert Mitchum, Richard Jordan, Steven Keats, Alex Rocco and  Peter Boyle
From the Mixed-Up Files of Mrs. Basil E. Frankweiler (a.k.a. The Hideaways), starring Ingrid Bergman

G
Godspell, starring Victor Garber
Godzilla vs. Megalon, directed by Jun Fukuda – (Japan)
La Grande Bouffe (Blow-Out), starring Marcello Mastroianni, Ugo Tognazzi, Michel Piccoli and Philippe Noiret – (France/Italy)

H
The Hare Census (Prebroyavane na Divite Zaytsi), directed by Eduard Zahariev, starring Itzhak Fintzi, Nikola Todev and Georgi Rusev – (Bulgaria)
The Harrad Experiment, starring Don Johnson, Tippi Hedren and James Whitmore
Heavy Traffic, an animated film by Ralph Bakshi
Hell Up in Harlem, starring Fred Williamson
High Plains Drifter, directed by and starring Clint Eastwood, with Verna Bloom, Marianna Hill and Geoffrey Lewis
The Hireling, directed by Alan Bridges, starring Robert Shaw and Sarah Miles – Palme d'Or winner – (U.K.)
Hitler: The Last Ten Days, starring Alec Guinness – (U.K./Italy)
The Holy Mountain (La Montaña Sagrada), directed by Alejandro Jodorowsky – (Mexico/U.S.)
Home Sweet Home (La fête à Jules) – (Belgium)
The Homecoming, directed by Peter Hall, starring Cyril Cusack, Ian Holm and Vivien Merchant – (U.K.)
Hot Winds (Garm Hava), directed by M. S. Sathyu – (India)
The Hourglass Sanatorium (Sanatorium pod klepsydrą), directed by Wojciech Has – (Poland)
The House in Nightmare Park, directed by Peter Skyes, starring Frankie Howerd and Ray Milland – (U.K.)
The House on Chelouche Street (Ha-Bayit Berechov Chelouche) – (Israel)
Hugo the Hippo (Hugó, a víziló) – (Hungary)

I
The Iceman Cometh, directed by John Frankenheimer, starring Lee Marvin, Fredric March, Robert Ryan and Jeff Bridges
Idaho Transfer, directed by Peter Fonda
Indian Summer, directed by Milen Nikolov, starring Georgi Partsalev, Leda Taseva and Tatyana Lolova – (Bulgaria)
Interval, starring Merle Oberon
L' Invitation (The Invitation), directed by Claude Goretta – Academy Award for Best Foreign Film – (France/Switzerland)
Ivan Vasilievich: Back to the Future (Ivan Vasilyevich menyayet professiyu) – (U.S.S.R.)

J
Jesus Christ Superstar, directed by Norman Jewison, starring Ted Neeley and Yvonne Elliman, music by Andrew Lloyd Webber
Jeremy, starring Robby Benson and Glynnis O'Connor
Jonathan Livingston Seagull, featuring voices of James Franciscus and Juliet Mills

K
Kanashimi no Belladonna (Belladonna of Sadness), Anime feature film – (Japan)
Kid Blue, starring Dennis Hopper, Warren Oates and Peter Boyle

L
Lady Ice, starring Donald Sutherland and Jennifer O'Neill
Lady Snowblood (Shurayukihime) – (Japan)
The Last American Hero, starring Jeff Bridges
The Last Detail, directed by Hal Ashby, starring Jack Nicholson, Randy Quaid and Otis Young
The Last of Sheila, directed by Herbert Ross, written by Stephen Sondheim and Anthony Perkins, starring Raquel Welch, Dyan Cannon, James Mason, James Coburn, Richard Benjamin, Joan Hackett and Ian McShane
The Laughing Policeman, starring Walter Matthau, Bruce Dern, Louis Gossett Jr., Joanna Cassidy and Cathy Lee Crosby
The Legend of Hell House, starring Pamela Franklin and Gayle Hunnicutt
The Legend of Paul and Paula (Die Legende von Paul und Paula) – (East Germany)
Le Magnifique, starring Jean-Paul Belmondo and Jacqueline Bisset – (France)
Little Tiger of Canton (Guang dong xiao lao hu), starring Jackie Chan – (Hong Kong)
Live and Let Die, starring Roger Moore (as James Bond), with Jane Seymour and Yaphet Kotto – (U.K.)
Lolly-Madonna XXX, starring Rod Steiger, Robert Ryan and Jeff Bridges
The Long Goodbye, directed by Robert Altman, starring Elliott Gould, Nina van Pallandt, Sterling Hayden, Mark Rydell, Henry Gibson and Jim Bouton
Lost Horizon, starring Peter Finch, John Gielgud, Liv Ullmann, George Kennedy and Olivia Hussey
Love and Anarchy (d'amore e d'anarchia), directed by Lina Wertmüller – (Italy)
Love and Pain and the Whole Damn Thing, directed by Alan J. Pakula, starring Timothy Bottoms and Maggie Smith

M
The Mackintosh Man, directed by John Huston, starring Paul Newman, Dominique Sanda and James Mason – (UK/US)
Magnum Force, directed by Ted Post, starring Clint Eastwood, Hal Holbrook, David Soul, Tim Matheson and Robert Urich
Malizia (Malicious) – (Italy)
Manson, a documentary film about Charles Manson
Massacre in Rome (Rappresaglia), directed by George Pan Cosmatos, starring Richard Burton and Marcello Mastroianni – (Italy)
Maurie, directed by Daniel Mann, starring Bo Svenson and Bernie Casey
Mean Streets, directed by Martin Scorsese, starring Harvey Keitel and Robert De Niro
Memory of a Night of Love, starring Salah Zulfikar, Nelly and Nabila Ebeid – (Syria)
The Mother and the Whore (La Maman et la Putain), directed by Jean Eustache, starring Jean-Pierre Léaud, Bernadette Lafont and Françoise Lebrun – (France)
 My Dear Brother starring Tarık Akan, Halit Akçatepe and Kahraman Kıral  –  (Turkey)
My Name Is Nobody (Il mio nome è Nessuno), starring Terence Hill and Henry Fonda – (Italy)

N
The Neptune Factor, starring Ben Gazzara, Yvette Mimieux and Ernest Borgnine
Nefertiti and Akhenaten, TV movie starring Geraldine Chaplin and Salah Zulfikar – (Mexico)
The No Mercy Man, starring Sid Haig and Ron Thompson
Night Flight from Moscow, starring Yul Brynner, Henry Fonda and Dirk Bogarde – (France/Italy/Germany)
Night Watch, starring Elizabeth Taylor and Laurence Harvey – (U.K.)
The Night Strangler, TV movie starring Darren McGavin
The Nutcracker (Schelkunchik) – (U.S.S.R.)

O
O Lucky Man!, directed by Lindsay Anderson, starring Malcolm McDowell, Helen Mirren, Ralph Richardson, Rachel Roberts and Arthur Lowe – (U.K.)
The Offence, directed by Sidney Lumet, starring Sean Connery, Ian Bannen and Trevor Howard
Oklahoma Crude, directed by Stanley Kramer, starring Faye Dunaway and George C. Scott
The Olsen Gang Goes Crazy (Olsen-banden går amok) – (Denmark)

P
The Paper Chase, starring Timothy Bottoms, Lindsay Wagner and John Houseman
Paper Moon, directed by Peter Bogdanovich, starring Ryan O'Neal, Tatum O'Neal and Madeline Kahn
Paperback Hero, starring Keir Dullea and Elizabeth Ashley – (Canada)
Papillon, directed by Franklin J. Schaffner, starring Steve McQueen and Dustin Hoffman
Pat Garrett and Billy the Kid, directed by Sam Peckinpah, starring James Coburn, Kris Kristofferson and Bob Dylan, with music by Dylan
The Pedestrian (Der Fußgänger), directed by Maximilian Schell, starring Peggy Ashcroft – Golden Globe for best foreign film – (West Germany/Switzerland/Israel)
Property Is No Longer a Theft (La proprietà non è più un furto), starring Ugo Tognazzi – (Italy)
The Pyx, starring Christopher Plummer and Karen Black- (Canada)

R
Resurrection of Eve, starring Marilyn Chambers
El Retorno de Walpurgis (a.k.a. The Curse of the Devil) – (Spain/Mexico)
Robin Hood, animated film with voices of Roger Miller, Phil Harris, Andy Devine, Peter Ustinov and Terry-Thomas

S
Save the Tiger, directed by John G. Avildsen, starring Jack Lemmon
Scarecrow, directed by Jerry Schatzberg, starring Gene Hackman and Al Pacino – Palme d'Or winner
Scenes from a Marriage (Scener ur ett äktenskap), directed by Ingmar Bergman, starring Liv Ullmann and Erland Josephson – (Sweden)
Scorpio, starring Burt Lancaster, Alain Delon, Paul Scofield and Gayle Hunnicutt
Scream Blacula Scream, starring William H. Marshall and Pam Grier
Serpico, directed by Sidney Lumet, starring Al Pacino
The Seven Madmen (Los siete locos), directed by Leopoldo Torre Nilsson – (Argentina)
The Seven-Ups, starring Roy Scheider and Tony Lo Bianco
Shamus, starring Burt Reynolds, Dyan Cannon and John P. Ryan 
Showdown, starring Dean Martin and Rock Hudson
Sisters, directed by Brian De Palma, starring Margot Kidder and Jennifer Salt
Slaughter's Big Rip-Off, starring Jim Brown, Brock Peters and Ed McMahon
Sleeper, directed by and starring Woody Allen, with Diane Keaton
Slither, starring James Caan, Sally Kellerman and Peter Boyle
The Society of the Spectacle (La Société du Spectacle) – (France)
Son of Zorro
Soul Hustler, directed by Bert Topper, starring Fabian Forte, Nai Bonet, Tony Russel and Casey Kasem
Soylent Green, directed by Richard Fleischer, starring Charlton Heston, Leigh Taylor-Young and Edward G. Robinson
The Spirit of the Beehive (El espíritu de la colmena), directed by Victor Erice – (Spain)
Stateline Motel, starring Eli Wallach, Ursula Andress, Fabio Testi and Eli Wallach – Canada/Italy
Steelyard Blues, starring Donald Sutherland and Jane Fonda
Steptoe and Son Ride Again, starred Wilfrid Brambell and Harry H. Corbett – (U.K.)
The Sting, directed by George Roy Hill, starring Paul Newman, Robert Redford, Robert Shaw, Eileen Brennan, Charles Durning and Ray Walston – winner of 7 Academy Awards
The Stone Killer, starring Charles Bronson
Super Fly T.N.T., directed by and starring Ron O'Neal
Superdad, starring Bob Crane, Barbara Rush and Kurt Russell
Sweet Kill, starring Tab Hunter

T
The Tenderness of Wolves (Die Zärtlichkeit der Wölfe) – (West Germany)
That'll Be the Day, starring David Essex, Rosemary Leach and Ringo Starr – (U.K.)
Theatre of Blood, starring Vincent Price, Diana Rigg, Ian Hendry and Robert Morley
Themroc, starring Michel Piccoli – (France)
There's No Smoke Without Fire (Il n'y a pas de fumée sans feu), starring Annie Girardot – (France)
The Other Man, starring Salah Zulfikar, Shams El Baroudi and Zubaida Tharwat – (Egypt)
The Thief Who Came to Dinner, starring Ryan O'Neal, Jacqueline Bisset and Warren Oates
The Three-Day Reign (Samil cheonha) – (South Korea)
The Three Musketeers, directed by Richard Lester, starring Michael York, Oliver Reed, Richard Chamberlain, Frank Finlay, Raquel Welch, Charlton Heston, Faye Dunaway and Christopher Lee – (U.K./U.S.)
Three Nuts for Cinderella (Tři oříšky pro Popelku) – (Czechoslovakia/East Germany)
A Touch of Class, starring George Segal and Glenda Jackson – (U.K.)
Tom Sawyer, starring Johnny Whitaker and Jodie Foster
Touki Bouki (Journey of the Hyena) – (Senegal)
The Train Robbers, starring John Wayne and Ann-Margret
Tsugaru Folk Song (Tsugaru Jongarabushi) – (Japan)
Turkish Delight (Turks Fruit), directed by Paul Verhoeven, starring Rutger Hauer – (Netherlands)
Two Men in Town (Deux hommes dans la ville), starring Jean Gabin and Alain Delon – (France)
Two People, directed by Robert Wise, starring Peter Fonda and Lindsay Wagner

U
Ultimul cartuş (The Last Bullet) – (Romania)

V
The Vault of Horror, starring Glynis Johns, Terry-Thomas and Curd Jürgens – (U.K.)
Voices, starring David Hemmings and Gayle Hunnicutt – (U.K.)

W
Walking Tall, starring Joe Don Baker
The Way We Were, directed by Sydney Pollack, starring Barbra Streisand and Robert Redford
We Want the Colonels (Vogliamo i colonnelli), starring Ugo Tognazzi – (Italy)
Wedding in Blood (Les Noces rouges), directed by Claude Chabrol, starring Stéphane Audran and Michel Piccoli – (France)
Westworld, directed by Michael Crichton, starring Yul Brynner, Richard Benjamin and James Brolin
White Lightning, starring Burt Reynolds
Wicked, Wicked, starring David Bailey, Edd Byrnes and Tiffany Bolling
The Wicker Man, directed by Robin Hardy, starring Edward Woodward, Christopher Lee, Diane Cilento and Britt Ekland– (U.K.)
Willie Dynamite, directed by Gilbert Moses, starring Roscoe Orman, Diana Sands, Thalmus Rasulala and Roger Robinson
The World's Greatest Athlete, starring Jan-Michael Vincent and John Amos

Z
Zanjeer (Shackles) – (India)
Ziddi (Action)- (Pakistan)

1973 Wide-release movies
United States unless stated

January–March

April–June

July–September

October–December

Births
January 7 – Baiba Broka, Latvian actress
January 10 – Ryan Drummond, American actor and comedian
January 14 – Katie Griffin, Canadian actress and singer.
January 17 - Bob Persichetti, American animator, story artist, storyboard artist, screenwriter and director
January 18 - Ben Willbond, English actor and screenwriter
January 23 – Lanei Chapman, American actress
January 24 – William Gregory Lee, American actor
January 29 – Arben Bajraktaraj, Korovan-born French actor
January 31 – Portia de Rossi, Australian-Canadian actress
February 12 – Tara Strong, Canadian-American voice actress
February 14 - Kristen Dalton (actress), American actress
February 17 – Lucy Davis, English actress
February 18 – Tom Wisdom, English actor
February 25 – Anson Mount, American actor
February 27 – Li Bingbing, Chinese actress
March 1 – Jack Davenport, English actor
March 3 - Matthew Marsden, English-American actor, producer and singer
March 4 – Len Wiseman, American director, screenwriter and producer
March 8 - Boris Kodjoe, German actor and producer
March 13 – Ólafur Darri Ólafsson, Icelandic-American actor, producer and screenwriter
March 16 - Jerome Flynn, English actor and singer
March 18 – Luci Christian, American voice actress
March 20 – Jane March, English actress and model
March 22 - Clay Kaytis, American animator and director
March 24 – Jim Parsons, American actor and producer
April 2 – Roselyn Sánchez, Puerto Rican singer-songwriter, dancer, model, actress, producer and writer
April 3 – Adam Scott (actor), American actor, comedian and producer
April 6 – Cindy Robinson, American voice actress
April 10 – Guillaume Canet, French actor
April 11
Kris Marshall, English actor
Alec Musser, American fitness model and actor
April 12 - Amr Waked, Egyptian actor
April 14 – Adrien Brody, American actor
April 19
Michael Bacall, American screenwriter and actor
David Soren (animator), Canadian director, writer, voice actor and storyboard artist
April 22 – Christopher Sabat, American voice actor
April 30
Robyn Griggs, American actress (d. 2022)
Antonino Isordia, Mexican director
May 5 – Tina Yothers, American actress
May 8 - Marcus Brigstocke, British comedian and actor
May 10 – Tora Sudiro, Indonesian actor
May 12 - Mackenzie Astin, American actor
May 17
Sasha Alexander, American actress and director
Matthew McGrory, American actor (d. 2005)
May 21 - Noel Fielding, English comedian, writer, actor, artist, musician and television presenter
May 27 - Jack McBrayer, American actor, singer and comedian
May 30 - Minae Noji, Japanese-American actress
June 1 - Adam Garcia, Australian actor
June 2 - Kevin Feige, American producer
June 8 - Lexa Doig, Canadian actress
June 9 - Orlando Wells, English actor and writer
June 12 - Mel Rodriguez, American actor
June 15 – Neil Patrick Harris, American actor
June 16 – Eddie Cibrian, American actor
June 17 - Louis Leterrier, French director and producer
June 18 - Julie Depardieu, French actress
June 21 – Juliette Lewis, American actress
June 27 - Razaaq Adoti, British actor, producer and screenwriter
July 2 - Peter Kay, English comedian and actor
July 3 - Patrick Wilson, American actor, director and singer
July 6 - William Lee Scott, American actor
July 9 - Enrique Murciano, American actor
July 11 - Jason Liebrecht, American voice actor
July 16 - Robert Jayne, American actor
July 19 - Saïd Taghmaoui, French-American actor and screenwriter
July 22 - Jaime Camil, Mexican actor and singer
July 23 - Kathryn Hahn, American actress and comedian
July 24 - Jamie Denbo, American actress, writer and comedian
July 26 – Kate Beckinsale, English actress
July 29 - Stephen Dorff, American actor
August 2 - Simon Kinberg, British-born American filmmaker
August 3 - Michael Ealy, American actor
August 5 - Michael Hollick, American actor
August 6
Asia Carrera, American former pornographic actress
Vera Farmiga, American actress
August 8 – Jessica Calvello, American voice actress
August 9 - Kevin McKidd, Scottish actor and television director
August 19 - Ahmed Best, American actor, comedian and musician
August 22 – Kristen Wiig, American actress and comedian
August 24
Dave Chappelle, American actor
Carmine Giovinazzo, American actor, writer and musician
Grey Griffin, American actress, comedian and singer songwriter
Barrett Oliver, American former child actor
August 25 - Ben Falcone, American filmmaker, comedian and actor
September 4
Jason David Frank, American actor and mixed martial artist (d. 2022)
Lazlow Jones, American writer, producer, director, voice actor and radio personality
September 5
Paddy Considine, English actor, director, screenwriter and musician
Rose McGowan, American actress
September 7 – Shannon Elizabeth, American actress
September 12 –
Maximiliano Hernández, American actor
Paul Walker, American actor and producer (d. 2013)
September 14 – Andrew Lincoln, English actor
September 18 – James Marsden, American actor
September 25 - Bridgette Wilson, former American actress and singer
September 26 – Julienne Davis, American actress and model
October 1 – Christian Borle, American actor and singer
October 2 – Efren Ramirez, American actor
October 3
Neve Campbell, Canadian actress
Richard Ian Cox, Welsh-Canadian voice actor
Lena Headey, English actress
October 6 – Ioan Gruffudd, Welsh actor
October 8 - Jan Pavel Filipensky, Czech actor
October 10 – S. S. Rajamouli, Indian directir
October 22 – Carmen Ejogo, British actress and singer
October 24
Burgess Jenkins, American actor
Kurt Kuenne, American filmmaker
October 26 – Seth MacFarlane, American actor, voice actor, animator, screenwriter, comedian, television producer, director and singer
November 1 – Aishwarya Rai, Indian actress
November 4 - Steven Ogg, Canadian actor
November 11 - Chris McKay, American filmmaker
November 14 - Dana Snyder, American actor and voice actor
November 21 - Brook Kerr, American actress
November 24 - Lucy Liemann, British actress
November 26 – Peter Facinelli, American actor
November 27
Tadanobu Asano, Japanese actor
Sharlto Copley, South African actor
December 1 - Lombardo Boyar, American actor
December 3 - Bruno Campos, Brazilian-American actor and lawyer
December 11 - Mos Def, American rapper, singer, songwriter and actor
December 14
Thuy Trang, Vietnamese-American actress (d. 2001)
Jan Uuspõld, Estonian actor
December 17 - Rian Johnson, American filmmaker

Deaths

Debuts
Danny Aiello – Bang the Drum Slowly
Daniel Auteuil – The Year 01
Graham Beckel – The Paper Chase
Colleen Camp – Battle for the Planet of the Apes
John Candy – Class of '44
Joanna Cassidy – The Outfit
David Clennon – The Paper Chase
Laura Dern – White Lightning
Pino Donnagio – Don't Look Now (film composer)
Anthony Edwards – Big Zapper
Emilio Estevez – Badlands
Sasson Gabai – Light Out of Nowhere
Victor Garber – Godspell
John Glover – Shamus
Rutger Hauer – Turkish Delight
Isaac Hayes – Wattstax
Gérard Jugnot – The Year 01
Stan Lee – The Year 01
Kay Lenz – American Graffiti
Tatum O'Neal – Paper Moon
Bernadette Peters – Ace Eli and Rodger of the Skies
David Proval – Mean Streets
Kathleen Quinlan – American Graffiti
John Rhys-Davies – Penny Gold
O.J. Simpson – Why
Stellan Skarsgård – Anita – ur en tonärsflickas dagbok
Carl Weathers – Magnum Force

Notes

References

 
Film by year